is a Japanese politician and a member of the House of Representatives He previously served as the Minister of Agriculture, Forestry and Fisheries in the Cabinet of Prime Minister Shinzō Abe.

Career
A native of Kadogawa, Miyazaki and graduate of Seijo University, Eto was elected to the hous efor the first time in 2003, succeeding his father, a controversial former government minister, Takami Eto.

Taku Eto's profile on the LDP website:
Secretary to a Diet Member
Parliamentary Secretary for Agriculture, Forestry and Fisheries(Fukuda Cabinet)
Acting Director, Agriculture and Forestry Division of LDP
Director, Committee on Agriculture, Forestry and Fisheries of Diet
Senior Vice-Minister of Agriculture, Forestry and Fisheries of LDP's Shadow Cabinet
Senior Vice Minister of Agriculture, Forestry and Fisheries

Positions
Taku Eto's views are consistent with his father's: Takami Eto infuriated Japan's neighbors by defending the 1910 Annexation Treaty which gave the control of Korea to the Empire of Japan, denying the fact that Korea was invaded, campaigning for the revision of textbooks mentioning 'comfort women', the women and girls forced into sexual slavery., or also denying the existence of the Nanking massacre.

Taku Eto is affiliated to the openly revisionist lobby Nippon Kaigi, which advocates a restoration of monarchy in the archipelago and negates the existence of Japanese war crimes. He was among the 86 MPs invited to the meeting for the 'one million people rally to protect the Imperial tradition' in March 2006, and among the people who signed ‘THE FACTS’, an ad published in The Washington Post on June 14, 2007, in order to protest against United States House of Representatives House Resolution 121, and to deny the existence of sexual slavery for the Imperial military ('Comfort women').

Taku Eto belongs to the following Diet groups, very consistent with Nippon Kaigi's vision:
Nippon Kaigi Diet discussion group (日本会議国会議員懇談会 - Nippon kaigi kokkai giin kondankai)
Japan Rebirth (創生「日本」- Sosei Nippon)
Conference of parliamentarians on the Shinto Association of Spiritual Leadership (神道政治連盟国会議員懇談会) - NB: SAS a.k.a. Sinseiren, Shinto Political League, Shinto Seiji Renmei Kokkai Giin Kondankai 
Diet Celebration League of the 20th Anniversary of His Majesty The Emperor's Accession to the Throne (天皇陛下御即位二十年奉祝国会議員連盟)
Conference of lawmakers to promote value-based diplomacy (価値観外交を推進する議員の会)
Conference of young parliamentarians supporting the idea that the Yasukuni Shrine is a true national interest and desire for peace (平和を願い真の国益を考え靖国神社参拝を支持する若手国会議員の会)
Conference to consider the true human rights (真の人権擁護を考える懇談会)

Eto also gave the following answers to the questionnaire submitted by Mainichi to parliamentarians in 2012:
in favor of the revision of the Constitution
in favor of right of collective self-defense (revision of Article 9)
in favor of reform of the National assembly (unicameral instead of bicameral)
no answer for the reactivation of nuclear power plants
no answer for the goal of zero nuclear power by 2030s
in favor of the relocation of Marine Corps Air Station Futenma (Okinawa)
no answer for the evaluation of the purchase of Senkaku Islands by the Government
no answer for a strong attitude versus China
against the participation of Japan to the Trans-Pacific Partnership
against a nuclear-armed Japan
against the reform of the Imperial Household that would allow women to retain their Imperial status even after marriage

References

External links 
  in Japanese.

Members of the House of Representatives (Japan)
Living people
1960 births
Members of Nippon Kaigi
Liberal Democratic Party (Japan) politicians
21st-century Japanese politicians
Seijo University alumni